Ifanes e Paradela is a civil parish in the municipality of Miranda do Douro, Portugal. It was formed in 2013 by the merger of the former parishes Ifanes and Paradela. The population in 2011 was 325, in an area of 44.70 km².

References

Freguesias of Miranda do Douro